Hunts and Peterborough County Rugby Union is an amalgamation of Rugby Union teams from around Peterborough and Huntingdonshire.

It is a sub-county of the East Midlands Rugby Football Union and holds its own county cup each season.

Playing colours: Red, green, yellow & blue hoops.

Member teams 
 Deepings RUFC
 Huntingdon RFC
 [https://peterboroughrufc.rfu.club/
 Peterborough Lions RFC
 St Ives RFC
 St. Neots RUFC
 Thorney RUFC
 Westwood RUFC

Representative teams 
Hunts & Peterborough County Rugby Union has representative teams at U13, U14, U15 and U16 levels and these teams play matches against other counties in the East Midlands Rugby Union jurisdiction.

County Cup draw

Past Cup Champions 
2012/13 season - St Ives RFC  12 April 2013 Deepings (21) V (24) St Ives

2011/12 season - 

2010/11 season - 

2009/10 season - 

2008/09 season - 

2007/08 season - Peterborough Lions  2 February 2008 Peterborough Lions (18) v (12) Deepings

External links 
 H&PCRU Website
 H&PCRU Website
 East Midland Rugby Union Website

Rugby union governing bodies in England
Sport in Peterborough
Sport in Huntingdonshire